Kelardasht (also Romanized as Kalārdasht) is a city and capital of Kelardasht District, in Chalus County, Mazandaran Province, Iran.  At the 2006 census, its population was 11,921, in 3,361 families.

The city comprises 5 districts (Hasankif, Lahoo, Kordichal, Valbal and Rudbarak, Mazandaran).  Hasankif has been the business district for many years and is currently also the political center.

Originally a farming area, in recent years much of its land was sold in small lots to build numerous villas which are occupied by summer visitors trying to escape the heat of Tehran and points further south.

Its attractions include Alamkooh Mountain (the second tallest peak in Iran (4850 m)), Abbasabad Road, Valasht lake and cooler climate. Picnicking and mountain climbing in the area surrounding Rudbarak, Mazandaran, Mazandaran are also popular, as well as in the Abbasabad Forest nearby.

The majority of the inhabitants speak Mazandarani language, but a few migrants speak Kurdish.

See also
Kelar Mound, Neolithic dwelling site in Kelardasht
Rudbarak, Mazandaran, Roudbarak located North of Kelardasht
Mazichal, Mazichal Village in Kelardasht . Mazichal is the forest village which is located in the North of Iran in Kelardasht Province and is known for its Cloud Ocean & breathtaking scenes and views. Mazichal in local language means the Forest Pit full of Oak Trees. this area is a popular tourist destination, as it has many areas with unique geological, historic, and cultural features. Mazichal is located 2,600m above sea level

References

External links

 Kelardasht Photo Album

Cities in Mazandaran Province
Populated places in Chalus County
Tourist attractions in Mazandaran Province